Buzz!: Brain Bender, developed by Curve Studios for the PlayStation Portable, is the second game in the  Buzz! series to be made for a hand-held console. Unlike other games in the Buzz! series Brain Bender is a puzzle game rather than a quiz game. The game features 16 mini-games covering four categories: Analysis, Observation, Memory, and Calculation with each category having three levels of difficulty easy, normal, and hard. The multiplayer aspect of the game is a customisable four-round match called Brain Battle.

References

External links
Curve Studios

Buzz!
2008 video games
PlayStation Portable games
Sony Interactive Entertainment games
PlayStation Portable-only games
Video games developed in the United Kingdom
Europe-exclusive video games
Multiplayer and single-player video games
Curve Games games

fi:Buzz! Master Quiz